The 2006 NCAA men's volleyball tournament was the 37th annual tournament to determine the national champion of NCAA men's collegiate indoor volleyball. The single elimination tournament was played at Rec Hall in University Park, Pennsylvania during May 2006.

UCLA defeated Penn State in the final match, 3–0 (30–27, 30–27, 30–27), to win their nineteenth national title. The Bruins (26–12) were coached by Al Scates. This was Scates' final title before retiring in 2012; Scates was with the Bruins for all 19 of their championships.

UCLA's Steve Klosterman was named the tournament's Most Outstanding Player. Klosterman, along with six other players, comprised the All Tournament Team.

Qualification
Until the creation of the NCAA Men's Division III Volleyball Championship in 2012, there was only a single national championship for men's volleyball. As such, all NCAA men's volleyball programs, whether from Division I, Division II, or Division III, were eligible. A total of 4 teams were invited to contest this championship.

Tournament bracket 
Site: Rec Hall, University Park, Pennsylvania

All tournament team 
Steve Klosterman, UCLA (Most outstanding player)
Damien Scott, UCLA
Dennis Gonzalez, UCLA
Dan O'Dell, Penn State
Matt Proper, Penn State
Nate Meerstein, Penn State
Jayson Jablonsky, UC Irvine

See also 
 NCAA Men's National Collegiate Volleyball Championship
 NCAA Women's Volleyball Championships (Division I, Division II, Division III)

References

2006
NCAA Men's Volleyball Championship
NCAA Men's Volleyball Championship
2006 in sports in Pennsylvania
Volleyball in Pennsylvania